Kilamangalam is a village in the Orathanadu taluk of Thanjavur district, Tamil Nadu, India.

Demographics 

As per the 2001 census, Kilamangalam had a total population of 2372 with 1140 males and 1232 females. The sex ratio was 1081. The literacy rate was 57.52.

References 

 

Villages in Thanjavur district